William Rushby (18 November 1888 – 1981) was an English professional footballer who played as a wing half.

References

1888 births
1981 deaths
People from Cleethorpes
English footballers
Association football wing halves
Cleethorpes Town F.C. players
Grimsby Town F.C. players
Castleford Town F.C. players
Grimsby Rovers F.C. players
Haycroft Rovers F.C. players
English Football League players